Paratanytarsus is a genus of European non-biting midges in the subfamily Chironominae of the bloodworm family Chironomidae.

Species
 Paratanytarsus corbii Trivinho-Strixino, 2010
 Paratanytarsus grimmi (Schneider, 1885)
 Paratanytarsus silentii Trivinho-Strixino, 2010
 Paratanytarsus tolucensis Reiss, 1972

References

Chironomidae
Diptera of Europe